The Yasin , also known as Yassin, or Al-Yassin, is an anti-tank weapon developed by Hamas, first deployed in 2004. It was named after Hamas' spiritual leader, Sheik Ahmed Yasin, killed by the Israeli Defense Forces, or IDF, on March 22, 2004.

Primarily used by the Izz ad-Din al-Qassam Brigades, it has also been deployed by Hamas units in Gaza, including the Executive Force, and Naval Police. Other users include fighters connected to Fatah and the PFLP.

Although intended as an anti-tank weapon, the Yasin was chiefly operated against soft-skin vehicles, and personnel. In October 2018, it was reported the warheads were being repurposed as IEDs; research continues on a replacement effective against current Israeli armor.

History
Unveiled on August 30, 2004, the Yasin was reportedly developed by Hamas engineers from the Research and Industry Unit, directed by Adnan al-Ghoul, killed in Gaza by the IDF on October 22, 2004.

First used against Israeli soldiers and Palestinian police officers in 2005, after the 2006 Lebanon War, production was accelerated in anticipation of an armed conflict with Israel. During the 2006 Gaza conflict, there were reports of its use against Israeli forces in the Gaza Strip, as well as at Beit Lahiya. On August 14, 2007, Hamas reported firing a Yasin at an Israeli tank in Khan Yunis. During the Gaza War, Hamas Naval Police officers were reportedly trained in its use.

In 2018, Israeli intelligence claimed Yasin warheads were being converted into as balloon-based IEDs, since improvements to the armor used by Israeli military vehicles made them obsolete in their primary role. Efforts to develop  upgrade RPG rockets to penetrate protective armor continue, in a project known as Tandem 85.

Design
The Yasin's design was influenced by the RPG-2 and RPG-7, made in Gaza. From the former, it used the rocket launcher tube design and the warhead's external shape and rocket motor which are very simple. From the latter, the divergent nozzle at the launcher's rear to deflect recoil generated by launching the rocket with a rocket booster attached to the propelled grenade to extend its range and enhanced warhead. In addition, the large cone at the back end is taken from the RPG-7.

The RPG is reported to be made in small underground workshops, with an explosive filler made from molten TNT and powdered ammonium nitrate. While it has a claimed effective range of 300 meters, the Israeli Intelligence and Terrorism Information Center suggests between 200 and 250 meters.

According to fighters from Popular Resistance Committees's Saladin brigades, the Yasin was able to take down a Merkava Mk. 3 in an undisclosed date by firing it at a "weak point". However, it is more effective in urban warfare, able to destroy brick walls and penetrate a 21 cm steel plate from 150 meters, although the ITIC suggests  200 mm (20 cm).

References

Bibliography
 

Hamas
Anti-tank rockets of Palestine
Palestinian inventions
Homemade firearms
Insurgency weapons